Luka Racic (born 8 May 1999) is a Danish professional footballer who plays as a centre-back for SønderjyskE.

Racic is a graduate of the F.C. Copenhagen academy and began his senior career in England with Brentford in 2018. Following his promotion into the first team squad in 2019, he appeared sparingly before departing to join SønderjyskE in 2022. Racic represented Denmark at youth level.

Club career

F.C. Copenhagen 
A central defender, Racic began his career in the F.C. Copenhagen academy and was an unused substitute during two first team matches in the 2016–17 season. He departed the Parken Stadium in July 2018.

Brentford 
On 5 July 2018, Racic moved to England to join the B team at Championship club Brentford on a two-year contract, with the option of a further year. He was a part of the B team's 2019 Middlesex Senior Cup-winning squad and injuries in the first team squad allowed him to make two late-season first team appearances. In October 2019, Racic signed a new four-year contract and was promoted into the first team squad. He finished the 2019–20 season with seven appearances and one goal, but he did not feature during Brentford's unsuccessful playoff campaign.

Down the central defensive pecking order, Racic joined newly-promoted League One club Northampton Town on a loan for the duration of the 2020–21 season. He made 10 appearances before a back injury led to the termination of the loan in January 2021. Racic returned to match play with the B team in mid-April, but he did not win a call into a matchday squad before the end of Brentford's promotion-winning season. Despite being named in Brentford's 25-man Premier League squad for the first half of the 2021–22 season, Racic played exclusively for the B team during the first half of the campaign. He joined Danish 1st Division club HB Køge on loan in January 2022 and made 14 appearances and scored two goals during the remainder of the 2021–22 season.

Returning to the Community Stadium for the 2022–23 pre-season, Racic made one first team friendly appearance, but was not given a squad number ahead of the start of the regular season. He departed Brentford on 1 September 2022, after making 9 appearances and scoring one goal during four years with the club.

SønderjyskE 
On 1 September 2022, Racic transferred to Danish 1st Division club SønderjyskE for an undisclosed fee and signed a contract running until the end of the 2022–23 season.

International career 
Racic was capped by Denmark between U16 and U21 level. He was a part of the Danish 2016 UEFA European U17 Championship squad and made three appearances at the tournament.

Personal life 
Racic is of Montenegrin descent and his uncle's brother is goalkeeper Filip Đukić.

Career statistics

Honours 
Brentford B
 Middlesex Senior Cup: 2018–19

References

External links 

Luka Racic at soenderjyske.dk

Living people
1998 births
Danish men's footballers
Danish expatriate men's footballers
Denmark youth international footballers
Danish people of Montenegrin descent
Association football central defenders
Denmark under-21 international footballers
People from Greve Municipality
F.C. Copenhagen players
Brentford F.C. players
Northampton Town F.C. players
HB Køge players
SønderjyskE Fodbold players
English Football League players
Danish expatriate sportspeople in England
Expatriate footballers in England
Danish 1st Division players
Sportspeople from Region Zealand